Dolomiti lucane is a mountain range in the region of Basilicata, southern Italy. Located in the Southern Apennines and dominating the Basento Valley, the range is at the heart of the Gallipoli Cognato Piccole Dolomiti Lucane Regional Park, which also include the Gallipoli-Cognato forest. The range is named "Dolomiti" because of similarities to peaks in the Dolomites in northern Italy. The range was formed 15 million years ago.

Description
The highest point is Monte Caperrino, also called "Piccole Dolomiti", due to its resemblance to the Dolomite mountains near Venice and Trieste.

Flora and fauna
The range has a mixture of oak forest and alpine tundra. The tundra is home to unusual plants, such as red valerian, Lunaria annua, and Onosma lucana. Fauna of the range includes wild boar, red kites, swallows, kestrel, ravens, and peregrine falcons.

Climate
The climate of the range is due to its remoteness from the Mediterranean, hence is characteristic of the climate of the other Apennine mountains. Winters are cold, with snow on the ground up to two or three months. Summers are cool and breezy.

Municipalities
Comuni in the area include:
 Castelmezzano
 Pietrapertosa
 Albano di Lucania
 Campomaggiore

References

External links

Mountains of Basilicata